"Easy" is a song by Mat Zo and Porter Robinson. The song was released as a digital download in the United Kingdom by Ministry of Sound and Anjunabeats on 14 April 2013 and in the United States by Astralwerks on 7 May 2013. It debuted at number 28 on the UK Singles Chart. The track samples vocals from the song "Nothing Better" by Colourblind.

"Easy" was included on Mat Zo's late-2013 debut studio album Damage Control. He has also released his own remake of the song, retitled "EZ", for inclusion on the album.

Music video
An animated music video to accompany the release of "Easy" was first released onto YouTube on 8 March 2013 at a total length of three minutes and thirty-four seconds. The creators of this video were the animation group, The Line.

The video follows a pop star by the name of Maki. She ignores her manager's attempts to contact her, and then she leaves her apartment complex on a motorcycle, with a large duffel bag. After she has driven a distance on the highway out of the city, she activates it, which causes what would appear to be a large expanding dome of light, possibly an explosion. She calmly and happily waits for the dome to catch up with her after it has consumed the city, and is then floating in a white void in a different art style. Then she appears riding a bicycle amid peaceful scenery matching a photo seen earlier in the video. The video contains many references to the classic anime film Akira. Some are visual, such as the light paths left by motorcycles, but there is at least one plot reference in the form of the explosion that consumes the city.

As of November 2017, the video has received over 10 million views.

Track listing

Chart performance

Weekly charts

Year-end charts

Release history

References

2013 singles
2013 songs
Mat Zo songs
Porter Robinson songs
Astralwerks singles
Ministry of Sound singles
Animated music videos
Song recordings produced by Mat Zo
Song recordings produced by Porter Robinson
Songs written by Mat Zo
Songs written by Porter Robinson